Van Metre Ford Stone Bridge is a historic stone arch bridge located near Martinsburg, Berkeley County, West Virginia. Built by  Pennsylvania builder Silas Harry, it was built in 1832, and is a three span bridge crossing Opequon Creek. It is 132 feet long and constructed of ashlar limestone. The center span measures 32 feet and the two side spans are each 29.5 feet long.

It was listed on the National Register of Historic Places in 1977.  A historic marker at the bridge says:
Named for the property owners this stone bridge built in 1832 across Opequon Creek was major improvement for travellers on Warm Springs Road connecting Alexandria and Bath Va., site of famous mineral waters. The Berkeley County Court established a commission to study and contract for construction of bridge. Silas Harry erected at local expense 165 foot bridge at reported cost of $3,700.

The bridge was replaced by a modern, two-lane bridge in 2016. The historic stone bridge  remains as a pedestrian bridge.

References

Road bridges on the National Register of Historic Places in West Virginia
Bridges completed in 1832
Buildings and structures in Berkeley County, West Virginia
National Register of Historic Places in Martinsburg, West Virginia
Stone arch bridges in the United States